Tappan (also Franklin) is an unincorporated community in Harrison County, Ohio, United States.

Notable person
Mary Jobe Akeley, explorer, writer, and photographer

References

Unincorporated communities in Harrison County, Ohio
Unincorporated communities in Ohio